Abismo de pasión (English: Abyss of Passion) is a Mexican telenovela produced by Angelli Nesma Medina for Televisa. It is a remake of the 1996 telenovela Cañaveral de Pasiones by Caridad Bravo Adams. The telenovela aired on Canal de las Estrellas from January 23 to September 2, 2012

The telenovela follows childhood friends Elisa (Angelique Boyer), Damián (David Zepeda), and Gael (Mark Tacher) as they reunite as adults after their families were torn apart by a scandal. Alejandro Camacho, Blanca Guerra, Sabine Moussier, Salvador Zerboni, and Eugenia Cauduro also star.

In the United States, the telenovela aired on Univision weeknights at 9pm EST from March 12 to November 7, 2012. The finale was followed by a program where the cast discussed their experience working on the show.

Plot 
Abismo de pasión takes place in La Ermita, Yucatán, where El Grupo Anito factory is located. Rosendo, the plant's owner, is having an affair with Carmina. Later that night, he, his wife Alfonsina, and their son Damián have dinner with Rosendo's best friend Augusto, his wife Estefania, their daughter Elisa, and Carmina, Estefania's sister. Alfonsina privately tells Augusto that she believes his wife is cheating on him with her husband. When Rosendo and Carmina attempt to leave town, Estefania locks Carmina inside and gets into the car with Rosendo to reason with him. The two die in a car accident, seemingly confirming Alfonsina's theory that they were having an affair. A rift divides the families and Elisa and Damián are no longer allowed to play together. Damián is sent to study in Italy. Years later, he returns to La Ermita and reconnects with Elisa and Gael. He and Elisa begin falling in love until his fiancée Florencia arrives in town. Elisa, Damián, Florencia, Paloma, and Gael's romantic lives become entangled. Meanwhile, Carmina manipulates, lies, and murders to make sure her affair with Rosendo remains a secret. El Grupo Antio factory employee Gabino aspires to take over the firm, marry Alfonsina, and keep quiet his defrauding of El Grupo Anito.

Cast

Main 
 Alejandro Camacho as Augusto Castañón
 Blanca Guerra as Alfonsina Mondragón - Damián's mother and Rosendo's widow
 Angelique Boyer as Elisa Castañón Bouvier - daughter of Augusto and Estefania
 Briggitte Bozzo as Child Elisa
 David Zepeda as Damián Arango Mondragón - son of Rosendo and Alfonsina
 Robin Vega as Child Damián
 Mark Tacher as Gael Mondragón / Gael Arango Navarro - who was raised by Alfonsina's brother Lupe
 Diego Velázquez as Child Gael
 Sabine Moussier as Carmina Bouvier de Castañón - Estefania's sister, Rosendo's lover, and Augusto's husband
 Altair Jarabo as Florencia Landucci Cantú
 René Casados as Padre Guadalupe "Lupe" Mondragón, Alfonsina's brother and Gael's guardian
 Salvador Zerboni as Gabino Mendoza - El Grupo Anito employee and the series' main antagonist
 Eugenia Cauduro as Dolores "Lolita" Martínez - Braulio's wife
 Francisco Gattorno as Braulio Chinrios
 Alexis Ayala as Dr. Edmundo Tovar
 Livia Brito as Paloma González - granddaughter of Ramona, the town healer
 Marilyz León as Child Paloma

Recurring 
 Eric del Castillo as Lucio Elizondo
 Raquel Olmedo as Ramona González
 Nailea Norvind as Begoña Narvaez de Tovar
 Armando Araiza as Horacio Ramírez
 Isaura Espinoza as Maru
 Dacia González as Blanca "Nina" Muriel de Elizondo
 Sergio Mayer as Paolo Landucci
 Isabella Camil as Ingrid Navarro de Jasso
 Vanessa Arias as Antonia "Toña" Mendoza de Chinrios 
 Alberto Agnesi as Enrique Tovar Narvaez
 Ricardo Dalmacci as Guido Landucci
 Lourdes Munguía as Carolina "Carito" Meraz
 Esmeralda Pimentel as Kenia Jasso Navarro
 Jade Fraser as Sabrina Tovar Narvaez
 Adriano Zendejas as Vicente Chinrios / Vicente Mendoza

Guest stars 
 Ludwika Paleta as Estefanía Bouvier de Castañón
 César Évora as Rosendo Arango

Production 
Production of Abismo de pasión officially started on November 14, 2011 and took place in and around Yucatán.

Reception 
Univision's November 5, 2012, finale broadcast of Abismo de pasión averaged 5.4 million viewers.

Awards and nominations

References

External links 

Mexican telenovelas
Televisa telenovelas
2012 telenovelas
2012 Mexican television series debuts
2012 Mexican television series endings
Television shows set in Mexico City
Spanish-language telenovelas